Kalateh-ye Khuni (also Romanized as Kalāteh-ye Khūnī; also known as Kalāteh-ye Ḩūnī) is a village in Balaband Rural District, in the Central District of Fariman County, Razavi Khorasan Province, Iran. At the 2006 census, its population was 21, in 6 families.

References 

Populated places in Fariman County